Lamoria brevinaevella is a species of snout moth in the genus Lamoria. It was described by Zerny in 1934, and is known from Lebanon.

References

Moths described in 1934
Tirathabini